Psilocybe verae-crucis is a species of mushroom in the family Hymenogastraceae.

See also
Psilocybe

verae-crucis